The 2014 Omloop Het Nieuwsblad took place on 1 March 2014. It was the 69th edition of the international classic Omloop Het Nieuwsblad.

's Ian Stannard of Great Britain beat 's Greg Van Avermaet of Belgium in a two-up sprint.

Teams 
Non-UCI ProTeams are indicated by an asterisk below. Each of the 21 teams were permitted up to eight riders, for a maximum of 168 riders. 164 riders started the race.

The 21 teams invited to the race were:

Results 

|-
| 1
| 
| 
| align="right"| 4h 49' 55"
|-
| 2
| 
| 
| align="right"| s.t.
|-
| 3
| 
| 
| align="right"| + 24"
|-
| 4
| 
| 
| align="right"| + 24"
|-
| 5
| 
| 
| align="right"| + 24"
|-
| 6
| 
| 
| align="right"| + 1' 34"
|-
| 7
| 
| 
| align="right"| + 1' 34"
|-
| 8
| 
| 
| align="right"| + 1' 34"
|-
| 9
| 
| 
| align="right"| + 1' 34"
|-
| 10
| 
| 
| align="right"| + 1' 34"
|}

References 

2014
Omloop Het Nieuwsblad
Omloop Het Nieuwsblad
Omloop Het Nieuwsblad